Hyperolius pustulifer is a species of frog in the family Hyperoliidae.
It is found in Democratic Republic of the Congo and possibly Burundi.
Its natural habitats are rivers, freshwater marshes, and intermittent freshwater marshes.

References

pustulifer
Amphibians described in 1940
Taxonomy articles created by Polbot